Music Theatre International (MTI) is a theatrical licensing agency based in New York City.

Description

MTI was founded in 1952 by American composer and lyricist Frank Loesser and orchestrator Don Walker.  Along with licensing the rights to Loesser's works, the firm licenses production rights of over 500 Broadway, Off-Broadway, and West End musicals, including many hit shows. CBS acquired MTI in 1976. After SBK acquired CBS' music publishing in 1986, MTI was spun off as a separate company to a group led by Nicholas Firth. A group led by Freddie Gershon acquired MTI in 1989. Cameron Mackintosh became a partner in 1990 and majority owner in 2015.

Musical types
MTI holds various types of musicals one can license.
 MTI Show: These are shows from various types of theater such as Broadway. These include musicals such as Ragtime, Ain't Misbehavin', Pippin, and Seussical.
 Broadway Junior: These sixty-minute musicals have been adapted for middle school kids to perform. Any subject matter deemed inappropriate have been cut. It also is reduced to one act. These include junior versions of Annie, Fiddler on the Roof, The Lion King, The Little Mermaid, and The Music Man.
 Broadway Kids: These thirty-minute musicals have been specially adapted for elementary kids to perform. These musicals have been made exclusively for the Kids Collection. Such musicals include: Winnie the Pooh, The Lion King, and 101 Dalmatians.
 Musicals From The Disney Collection: Consists of musicals originally produced by Disney.
 School Editions: These are Broadway musicals that have been adapted for high school students to perform. These musicals have reduced certain subject matter, orchestration, and more. Such School Editions include: Rent, Sweeney Todd, Les Misérables, and Avenue Q.
 Theatre For Young Audiences: These seventy-minute musicals have been adapted for adults to perform for children. The cast requirement is small (usually 6-12).
 Concert Library: This collection has Broadway songs adapted for concerts.

Key executives

 Cameron Mackintosh, Chairman
 Freddie Gershon, Co-Chairman
 Drew H. Cohen, President & CEO
 John Prignano, COO and Director of Education & Development
 Carol Edelson, Senior Vice President of Licensing
 Rita Thibault, CFO
 Deborah Hartnett, Senior Vice President of General Counsel
 Jason Cocovinis, Director of Marketing
 Brian O'Sullivan, Director of Amateur Licensing
 Jody Edwards, Music & Materials Manager
 John Vantuno, CIO

Rating system
MTI uses a rating system that determines the content in the musical and it is shown on their website. The ratings are as follows:

Footnotes

External links
Music Theatre International Homepage
List of MTI Shows
MTI History

Licensing organizations
Children's theatre
Broadway theatre
American companies established in 1952
Arts organizations established in 1952
1952 establishments in New York City